The film industry based in Switzerland dates to the 1930s. It is influenced by the neighboring countries of France, Germany and Italy, with which it shares languages. Before the mid-1960s Swiss films were often sentimental, but the French New Wave led to more experimental cinema.

The Solothurn Film Festival was founded in 1966 with a declaration of showing the modern reality of Swiss Life. It is the most important festival for Swiss film productions.

The Locarno Festival founded in 1946 is an annual film festival held every August in Locarno, Switzerland.

As of 2014, The Swissmakers (1978) (Die Schweizermacher) is the highest grossing Swiss film of all time.

In German-speaking cantons, French-language films usually have German subtitles. Likewise, in French-speaking cantons, German-language films usually have French subtitles. Adult-oriented films in foreign languages are often screened with original audio and double subtitles in German and French. Children-oriented films in foreign languages are usually dubbed.

Notable personalities

Directors
 Richard Dembo
 Tim Fehlbaum
 Marcel Gisler
 Jean-Luc Godard
 Claude Goretta
 Xavier Koller
 Markus Imhoof
 Leopold Lindtberg
 Fredi Murer
 Dominique Othenin-Girard
 Daniel Schmid
 Franz Schnyder
 Alain Tanner
 Yves Yersin

Actors
 Ursula Andress
 Anne-Marie Blanc
 Sibylle Blanc
 Zarli Carigiet
 Eliane Chappuis
 Bruno Ganz
 Heinrich Gretler
 Emil Hegetschweiler
 Max Haufler
 Marthe Keller
 Maximilian Schell
 Ella Rumpf

Notes and references

Bibliography 
  Olivier Moeschler, Cinéma suisse. Une politique culturelle en action : l'État, les professionnels, les publics, Presses polytechniques et universitaires romandes, collection "Le savoir suisse", 2011.

See also 
 List of cinema of the world
 Freddy Buache
 List of Swiss films
 World cinema
 Swiss Film Archive

External links 
 Swiss Films
 Swiss DVD
 artfilm.ch Swiss Films in the theatres, television, DVD and VOD
 Swiss Film Directory
 All Swiss Films since 1896